The White Ring, officially Nagano City Mashima General Sports Arena, is an indoor sporting arena located in Nagano, Japan. The capacity of the arena is 7,000 people.

It was a venue at the 1998 Winter Olympics, hosting the figure skating and short track speed skating events.

It is the home arena of the Shinshu Brave Warriors of the B.League, Japan's professional basketball league.

References

External links
Official website

Basketball venues in Japan
Indoor arenas in Japan
Venues of the 1998 Winter Olympics
Olympic figure skating venues
Olympic short track speed skating venues
Shinshu Brave Warriors
Sports venues in Nagano Prefecture
Sport in Nagano (city)